Aleksandr Yevgenyevich Naumenko (born 9 November 1997) is a Russian football player.

Club career
He made his debut in the Russian Premier League for FC Tom Tomsk on 1 April 2017 in a game against FC Arsenal Tula.

References

External links
 

1997 births
Living people
Russian footballers
FC Tom Tomsk players
FC Khimik-Arsenal players
Russian Premier League players
Association football defenders